, also known as , is a mountain in the southeastern area of Toyama Prefecture, Japan. It is designated as one of the 100 Famous Japanese Mountains.

Overview 
Mount Suisho is the highest mountain in the Toyama and Kurobe River area. It is the 23rd highest mountain in Japan.

Etymology 
It is named "Mount Suisho" (crystal mountain) after the large crystals that have come from the mountain. As the mountain looks black, it is also named "Mount Kuro" or "Black Mountain".

Gallery

See also 
Chūbu-Sangaku National Park

References 

Hida Mountains
Chūbu-Sangaku National Park
Mountains of Toyama Prefecture
Japan Alps
Tateyama, Toyama